Eoperipatus totoro is a species of velvet worm of the family Peripatidae discovered in Vietnam in 2007. As of 2013, it is the only velvet worm known from Vietnam. The specific name is derived from caterpillar-like Catbus from the Japanese animated film My Neighbor Totoro. It has a distinct feature from other worms in having uniquely shaped hairs on its body surface. Its ability to spit out nets of sticky glue from its appendages is used for catching prey. Like other velvet worms in this genus, this species exhibits lecithotrophic ovoviviparity; that is, mothers in this genus retain yolky eggs in their uteri.

Taxonomy 
The first specimen was caught in Cát Tiên National Park, Vietnam by P.V. Kvartalnov, E.A. Galoyan and I.V. Palko from the Lomonosov Moscow State University and Vietnam-Russia Tropical Centre in November 2007. It was described for the first time in 2010 by Vietnamese researchers Thai Dran Bai and Nguyen Duc Anh. But formal description was made only in June 2013 by a team led by Georg Mayer and Ivo de Sena Oliveira from the University of Leipzig, Germany. The type specimen was a male caught in 2009 by Peter Geissler from the Alexander Koenig Research Museum.

Found in the Crocodile Lake area of the park, it is so far the only velvet worm described from Vietnam, although at least one other undescribed species lives in the country. Before 2013, only three valid species of Eoperipatus were recognised in Southeast Asia, and E. totoro as a distinct species was confirmed using detail data from scanning electron microscopy and molecular analysis (mitochondrial COI and 12S rRNA sequences).

The specific name totoro was requested by the collectors of the first specimen, who were reminded of the caterpillar-like Catbus from the Japanese animated film My Neighbor Totoro.

Description 
Unlike other velvet worms, E. totoro has uniquely shaped hairs on its body surface. These worms spend most of their lives inside moist soil, in rotting logs or under rocks. They come out only during rainy season, and therefore, are not easily seen. They can spit out jets of sticky glue from two appendages on their back, by which they capture small prey for food. The glue is composed of a mixture of proteins in which prey can be entangled. 

This species can reach 65 mm (2.6 in.) in length. Females have 24 pairs of legs; males have 23 pairs of legs. Diagnostic features include distinct types of scales on the ventral side of the body, the inner structure of the circular pits on the male genital pad, and the position and size of the anal gland pads in males.

References 

Onychophoran species
Onychophorans of southeast Asia
Animals described in 2013
Fauna of Southeast Asia
Invertebrates of Vietnam